Roman Dronin (born ) is a Uzbekistani male road and track cyclist. He competed in the under-23 road race at the 2011 UCI Road World Championships and in the individual pursuit and points race event at the 2011 UCI Track Cycling World Championships.

References

External links
 Profile at cyclingarchives.com

1983 births
Living people
Uzbekistani track cyclists
Uzbekistani male cyclists
Place of birth missing (living people)
21st-century Uzbekistani people